Rybachy (masculine), Rybachya (feminine), or Rybachye (neuter) is the name of several rural localities in Russia:
Rybachy, Kaliningrad Oblast, a settlement in Kurshsky Rural Okrug of Zelenogradsky District in Kaliningrad Oblast
Rybachy, Republic of Kalmykia, a settlement in Kumskaya Rural Administration of Chernozemelsky District in the Republic of Kalmykia; 
Rybachy, Primorsky Krai, a settlement in Nadezhdinsky District of Primorsky Krai
Rybachy, Samara Oblast, a settlement under the administrative jurisdiction of the town of oblast significance of Chapayevsk in Samara Oblast
Rybachy, Volgograd Oblast, a settlement in Frunzensky Selsoviet of Sredneakhtubinsky District in Volgograd Oblast
Rybachye, a selo under the administrative jurisdiction of the town of republic significance of Alushta in the Republic of Crimea

Notes